Territorial Assembly elections were held in French Togoland on 30 March 1952. The result was a victory for the Union of Chiefs and Peoples of the North, which won 15 of the 30 seats.

Results
Three of the MPs elected on Committee of Togolese Unity (CUT) lists were not party members; one was a trade unionist and two were members of local parties.

References

Elections in Togo
Togo
1952 in French Togoland
March 1952 events in Africa